Tharawal, also spelt Thurawal and Dharawal, is a small family of extinct Australian Aboriginal languages once spoken along the South Coast of New South Wales.

Number of languages in the group

According to Bob Dixon (2002), four Tharawal languages are attested, though he does not accept them as related:

Tharawal
Dhurga 
Dyirringanj 
Thawa
Claire Bowern (2011) lists three, among the Yuin languages:
 Dharawal

 Dhurga

 Thawa

Speakers
Peoples who spoke these languages include:

Clans and Families of The Northern Dharawal
Noron-Geragal
Targarigal
Goonamattagal
Wodi Wodi
Gweagal (Geawegal)

New South Wales south coast group
Dharawal
Dhurga or Thurga (Thoorga, Durga)
Dyirringanj (Djirringanj)
Thaua (Thawa)

References

 
Yuin–Kuric languages
Extinct languages of New South Wales